Anastasia Collins Frohmiller (July 28, 1891 – November 25, 1971), known as Ana, was a leading female politician in Arizona from the 1930s through the 1950s.  A native of Burlington, Vermont, she moved with her parents and eight siblings to Phoenix, Arizona in 1898.  In 1920 she was elected deputy county treasurer of Coconino County; she later became county treasurer.

She became the first woman to serve as State Auditor, to which she was elected in 1926.

Frohmiller served until 1950 when she ran an unsuccessful campaign for Governor against Howard Pyle. Arizona Senator and Republican Presidential candidate Barry Goldwater wrote in his memoir With No Apologies that Frohmiller was 'an attractive lady... who had earned quite a following as a result of her long and excellent service as state auditor'. He also observed that the voters of Arizona weren't ready for a woman governor in 1950 and may have been right. Frohmiller lost the election to Pyle, who became the first Republican Governor of Arizona since John Calhoun Phillips in 1928, despite the fact that at the time of her nomination she seemed to be the front-runner.

Frohmiller retired to Prescott, Yavapai County, Arizona, and died on November 25, 1971.

References

1891 births
1971 deaths
20th-century American politicians
20th-century American women politicians
Arizona Democrats
Politicians from Burlington, Vermont
Politicians from Prescott, Arizona
State Auditors of Vermont
Women in Arizona politics